Spring Lake Township may refer to:

 Spring Lake Township, Tazewell County, Illinois
 Spring Lake Township, Ottawa County, Michigan
 Spring Lake Township, Scott County, Minnesota
 Spring Lake Township, Ward County, North Dakota, in Ward County, North Dakota
 Spring Lake Township, Hand County, South Dakota, in Hand County, South Dakota
 Spring Lake Township, Hanson County, South Dakota, in Hanson County, South Dakota
 Spring Lake Township, Kingsbury County, South Dakota, in Kingsbury County, South Dakota

See also

Spring Lake (disambiguation)

Township name disambiguation pages